Bobby's Girl may refer to:
"Bobby's Girl" (song), a 1962 song performed by Marcie Blane, covered by many artists
Bobby's Girl (album), a 1982 album by Aileen Quinn

See also
Bobby's Ghoul, a British comic strip